C. minutus  may refer to:
 Calcinus minutus, a hermit crab species
 Chalcides minutus, the small three-toed skink, a lizard species found in Morocco and western Algeria
 Ctenomys minutus, the tiny tuco-tuco, a rodent species found in Brazil

See also
 List of Latin and Greek words commonly used in systematic names#M